The Rolling Stones' 1965 2nd European Tour was the first concert tour of France by the band. The tour commenced on April 16 and concluded on April 18, 1965.

The Rolling Stones
 Mick Jagger - lead vocals, harmonica, percussion
 Keith Richards - guitar, backing vocals
 Brian Jones - guitar, harmonica, backing vocals
 Bill Wyman - bass guitar, backing vocals
 Charlie Watts - drums

Tour set list
"Everybody Needs Somebody To Love" (intro)
"Around And Around"
"Off The Hook"
"Time Is On My Side"
"Carol"
"It's All Over Now"
"Little Red Rooster"
"Route 66"
"Everybody Needs Somebody To Love" (full song)
"The Last Time"
"I'm Alright"
"Hey Crawdaddy"

Tour dates

References
 Carr, Roy.  The Rolling Stones: An Illustrated Record.  Harmony Books, 1976.  

The Rolling Stones concert tours
1965 concert tours
1965 in France
Concert tours of Europe